Casper Elgaard  (born 5 April 1978) is a Danish auto racing driver. He has competed several times in the 24 Hours of Le Mans since 2001, as well as regular drives in the Le Mans Series. In 2008 he finished second in the LMP2 class of Le Mans for Team Essex in a Porsche RS Spyder. He also won his class at the 2008 1000 km of Monza. In 2009 24 Hours of Le Mans Elgaard won the LMP2 class in the Team Essex Porsche Spyder.

He is five times champion of the Danish Touring Car Championship between 2004 and 2006, and again in the series final season in 2010 as well as in 2014. Early racing includes finishing as runner-up in the 1998 Danish Formula Ford series, as well as a drive in German Formula Ford. In 1999 he raced in the Formula Renault Euro Cup.

After competing in the TCR Scandinavia Touring Car Championship in 2019, Elgaard will be driving for his team, Massive Motorsport, which was the first team to enter, in the inaugural TCR Denmark Touring Car Series in 2020.

24 Hours of Le Mans results

Complete TCR Denmark Touring Car Series results
(key) (Races in bold indicate pole position) (Races in italics indicate fastest lap)

* Season still in progress.

References

External links
 https://web.archive.org/web/20110911211551/http://www.casperelgaard.dk/
 Profile at Driver Database.

Living people
24 Hours of Le Mans drivers
Danish racing drivers
Danish Touring Car Championship drivers
1978 births
European Le Mans Series drivers

Aston Martin Racing drivers
Larbre Compétition drivers
Morand Racing drivers
Jota Sport drivers
24H Series drivers